Lemont Methodist Episcopal Church, also known as the Old Stone Church, is a historic church building at 306 Lemont Street in Lemont, Illinois.

It was built in 1861 and added to the National Register in 1986.

Lemont Area Historical Society and Museum
The building is now home to the Lemont Area Historical Society and Museum, which was founded in 1970 to save the building. The museum features displays of local history and culture.  The Society hosts historic programs, tours and lectures.

References

External links

 Lemont Area Historical and Museum

Methodist churches in Illinois
Buildings and structures on the National Register of Historic Places in Cook County, Illinois
Italianate architecture in Illinois
Churches completed in 1861
Churches in Lemont, Illinois
Churches on the National Register of Historic Places in Illinois
Museums in Cook County, Illinois
1861 establishments in Illinois
Italianate church buildings in the United States